The Rasheed (or sometimes known as the Rashid) is a semi-automatic carbine, derived from the Hakim Rifle and used by the Egyptian military. Only around 8,000 were made.

The Rasheed was designed by the Swedish engineer Erik Eklund, who based it on his previous Hakim Rifle, which was itself a slightly modified version of the Swedish Ag m/42 rifle.

Design
The carbine resembles the Soviet SKS carbine, particularly in the permanently attached pivoting-blade bayonet, which appears identical to its Russian counterpart. The 12-inch (305 mm) blade bayonet pivots from a mount under the barrel, back into a recessed groove in the forend stock.

The carbine features a rear ladder sight, with a "battle" position for short-range fire as well as increments of 100 to 1000 metres, although the latter distance greatly exceeds the 300-metre effective range of the weapon.

The semi-automatic mechanism is gas-operated through the direct impingement system. The Egyptian training manual had users use stripper clips to reload. However, the hot gas would heat up the receiver and cause burns when fingers would touch the receiver.

The Rasheed has a 10-round magazine capacity.

Variants

Baghdad Rifle
The Baghdad is a variant of the Rasheed, made from the same machinery from 1969 to 1977.

Users

 
 : Used the Baghdad rifle.

References

Weapons of Egypt
7.62×39mm semi-automatic rifles
Rifles of the Cold War
Infantry weapons of the Cold War
Military equipment introduced in the 1950s
Gas-operated firearms